Josefa Bayeu y Subías (1747 – 1812) was the sister of artist Francisco Bayeu, and wife of artist Francisco Goya. Francisco de Goya gave her the nickname "Pepa". She bore seven children to him, only one of whom lived past infancy and into adulthood. His name was Francisco Javier de Goya y Bayeu, born on 2 December 1784. The artworks below are by Goya.

References

Spanish women
Francisco Goya
1747 births
1812 deaths